The Pacific Lumber Company, officially abbreviated PALCO, and also commonly known as PL, was one of California's major logging and sawmill operations, located 28 miles (45 km) south of Eureka and 244 miles (393 km) north of San Francisco. Begun in 1863, PALCO was managed over most of the twentieth century by generations of the Simon J. Murphy, Sr. Family or managers chosen by the Murphys from 1905 through 1985. Primary operations existed in massive log storage and milling operations at the historic company town of Scotia, California, located adjacent to US 101 along the Eel River. Secondary mills were located in nearby Fortuna and Carlotta. PALCO had extensive timber holdings exceeding well over 200,000 acres (890 km²) in the Redwood and Douglas-Fir forests of Humboldt County. For generations, it was one of the largest private employers in the entire region, appropriately known as the Redwood Empire.

The company was transformed into a wholly owned subsidiary of Maxxam, Inc for its two final decades. In January 2007 the company filed for bankruptcy protection. On July 29, 2008, the "Final Order" from US Bankruptcy attorney, Judge Richard Schmidt, led to the transfer of the assets of the bankrupt PALCO and all its subsidiaries to the Mendocino Redwood Company and the town of Scotia to Marathon Structured Finance. After 145 years as PALCO, the new company is known as the Humboldt Redwood Company. Some of the affected parties, including Bank of New York Trust Company, filed an appeal and on September 29, 2009 the Court of Appeals for the 5th Circuit modified this judgment. However, the asset transfer and resulting companies were little changed by the modification and no other adjustments of any significance have occurred since.

Overview

The Pacific Lumber Company was started in 1863. Though it employed over 350 people in its final days in 2008, there were over 1,600 employees at the turn of the millennium. The company itself was a tourist attraction that once welcomed visitors for a tour of the (now permanently closed) largest Redwood Mill ever constructed, which included an unusual hydraulic debarker. The quaint town adjacent to the mill is still open to public visits. Pacific Lumber has been at the center of multiple controversies since a hostile takeover by Maxxam, Inc. (of Texas), that was completed in 1986. The company maintains that it is still a sustainable operation, but its policies and practices bear little resemblance to those before 1986. 1999 saw the sale of thousands of acres of land to become the Headwaters Forest Reserve. In that agreement, strict rules were put into place requiring the company to manage its holdings under more-restrictive practices. This in part led PALCO to file for bankruptcy in January 2007. By late in 2008 The Pacific Lumber Company ceased to exist.

History

19th century
Pacific Lumber (or PL, as locals have known it for generations) began during the heat of the US Civil War in 1863 when A. W. McPherson and Henry Wetherbee purchased  of timberland on California's Eel River at the rate of $1.25 per acre. Over the ensuing 20 years they added more partners and began significant logging by 1882, at the present main site and town, which was originally known as Forestville. By 1888, the company became the largest in Humboldt County, with 300 employees and lumber shipments exceeding  annually. By this time the town name was changed to Scotia and it boasted a Western Union telegraph station, church, post office, and school. In 1895, the company suffered a major setback as the entire town burned, suffering $400,000 in losses ($8,000,000 in today's terms). By that time, Simon J. Murphy, Sr. a Detroit business man and one of its first millionaires had consolidated his millions from Detroit and Southern California into PL. The Simon Murphy family, Stanwood Murphy and his direct descendants would be the controllers of the company for nearly a century The way they took care of business was shown handily after the big fire as they chose to rebuild everything, despite the fact that insurance covered only 25% of losses.

20th century
Life during early 20th century lumbering is documented by the Neill family’s Photo Album, which features 292 photographs of the Neill family, townspeople, and daily life in the company town of Scotia. Images reflect everyday life and hardships, local residents and homes, vacations, trips into the surrounding forest, and Pacific Lumber Company’s mill and work operations, between the years of 1908 and 1913. The Neil Photo Album is available for viewing at Humboldt State University’s Special Collections.

By 1905, Simon Murphy, Sr., originally of Detroit, Michigan and later of Whittier, California, completed the process of gaining control of the company. Through the rebuilding of San Francisco after the 1906 San Francisco earthquake, World War I, and numerous floods on the Eel River, the company came into the modern age. Beginning in the same decade, company management began participating in the preservation movement, primarily as a result of pressure from the Save the Redwoods League in San Francisco. Portions of prior PL holdings including the Rockefeller Forest, the world's largest remaining contiguous old growth Redwood Forest to survive, now comprises the core of Humboldt Redwoods State Park. Further developments included recycling of sawdust into the world's first Presto logs.

In 1931, Stanwood Murphy became president of the company. His unique foresight led to a drastic change in practices from the industry standard of clear cutting to a "selective cut" system of logging. This meant that the company would limit cutting to a maximum of 70 percent of the mature trees in a stand, leaving the younger, most vigorous trees to hold the soil and seed a new generation of forest. He also instituted the concept of "sustainable yield," which directed planners to never cut more than the company's forests could replace by new growth in any year. These practices were hailed as revolutionary and he and his direct heirs ran the company in this manner for the next 55 years.

By the 1950s, PALCO efforts to make Scotia a comfortable place to live and raise a family provided the following in the company town: affordable employee housing, stores, a school, a hospital, a skating rink, and a theatre. Under the Murphy family, the company implemented an employee pension plan, and provided free life insurance. By 1961, academic scholarships were also provided to students who were children of company employees. In 1975, PALCO was listed on the New York Stock Exchange.

Late 20th century
By the 1980s, this huge lumber operation had absolutely no debt, holding a partially diversified portfolio that included a high-rise building in San Francisco and lucrative welding operation in the San Francisco Bay Area, all derived from the company's 100-year-plan based on sustained yield directed cutting and profits carefully spent to protect cash flow. These long-term plans consequently and purposely led to a relatively low profit annually, which unwittingly were about to make the company vulnerable to "new" acquisition practices from Wall Street. The last Murphy to manage the company under these circumstances, Warren Murphy, reflected on what it was like to run such a stable enterprise with sound environmental practices: "We were the good guys. It was fun, it was easy—it was a great life."

1985 hostile takeover
On September 30, 1985, the venerable Pacific Lumber Company, having maneuvered through more than a century of business peaks and valleys, was taken over as a result of stock purchases culminating on September 27, 1985. The Murphy family (the largest minority stock holders at the time) and countless previous stockholders, mostly company employees, were relieved of their stock as a result of a hostile takeover by Charles Hurwitz and his Maxxam, Inc. corporation of Texas.

On February 26, 1986, the day after the completed takeover, Warren Murphy resigned, turning over the company to John A. Campbell, a man who had been one of his executive vice presidents. However, despite indisputable changes in the tenor and management of the company, its last major holding of contiguous old growth forest was ultimately preserved as environmental groups and various auspices of government worked to seek a deal that inevitably led to the creation of the Headwaters Forest in 1999 in exchange for $480 million in taxpayer money.

Clearcutting introduced under Maxxam

Between a desire to turn a higher profit and the need to start paying off the debt incurred from acquiring Pacific Lumber, Hurwitz's Maxxam replaced the sustainable growth policy of the previous owner-managers (primarily the Murphy family) with one of clearcutting.

Protests and resistance
On May 24, 1990, a bomb planted in the car of Earth First! activist Judi Bari exploded, sending her and fellow activist Darryl Cherney to the hospital. Judi and Darryl were on their way to a music and speaking event on the UC Santa Cruz campus, part of an organizing tour for Redwood Summer, which sought to inform the wider public about the tragedy unfolding in the Redwood Empire.

The explosion was a milestone of forest activism in the redwoods and elsewhere. The bomber was never identified. Oakland police and the FBI initially accused Bari and Cherney with transporting an explosive device under the driver's seat of her own car; but Alameda County prosecutors dropped the case for lack of evidence a few months later.  A lawsuit filed by Judi against the FBI for violation of Constitutional rights was ultimately successful in 2002, vindicating Darryl and Judi, but coming five years after Judi's untimely death from breast cancer at the age of 47.

On September 17, 1998, David Chain, an Earth First! activist was struck by a falling tree while trying to stop logging in Pacific Lumber property. He was killed instantly and died of massive head trauma. In response to his death, a Pacific Lumber Co. spokesperson said their logging crew did not see anybody in the area and were unaware of Chain's presence. Earth First! said that the loggers had been deliberately felling huge trees, in a perpendicular manner rather than downhill, in the protesters' direction. One of the protesters also noted that the tree fellers were fully aware that they were there, as the activists had been "yelling at them, walking towards them, telling them 'Don't fell this tree'". On a videotape supplied by Earth First!, Arlington Earl Ammons, the 52-year-old logger responsible for felling the tree that caused Chain's death can be heard shouting expletives and threatening the protesters.

Beginning of a new millennium

The company filed for bankruptcy protection in January 2007. A Texas bankruptcy court considered reorganization  options early in 2008. On June 6, 2008 the judge preliminarily decided to confirm the Mendocino Redwood Company option for reorganization and signed the order on July 8, 2008. The company's bond holders attempted to appeal, but on July 24, the appellate court in Louisiana refused to hear the case. Timber note holders stated that this will mean the Mendocino Redwood Company/ Marathon plan will be able to go forward, and many agree that any future court will be unlikely to undo it.

Railroads

Pacific Lumber Company incorporated the Humboldt Bay and Eel River Railroad on 17 November 1882 to transport lumber from the Scotia sawmill to Humboldt Bay for loading aboard ships. The railway was completed across the Scotia Bluffs to Alton, California on 20 August 1885 where connection was made with the Eel River and Eureka Railroad for the remainder of the distance to Humboldt Bay. Rails were extended southward up the Eel River from Scotia to bring logs into the sawmill. Atchison, Topeka and Santa Fe Railway merged the Pacific Lumber Company railway into their subsidiary San Francisco and Northwestern Railway on 15 May 1903, although Pacific Lumber Company retained timber rights and the ability to use the line for their logging operations. The railway became part of the Northwestern Pacific Railroad on 8 January 1907.  Pacific Lumber Company built flatcars from wood and maintained a fleet of locomotives for moving logs from the woods into the mill and for switching cars for loading or unloading at the sawmill. Diesels replaced steam locomotives in 1955. Log trains of wooden flat cars ran to the Scotia mill until 1976 from a log deck in Carlotta, California. Company switchers were stationed at Scotia until Northwestern Pacific Railroad discontinued service.

Locomotives

Environmental issues
Under pressure from environmental activists, the company considered selling 6,000 acres (24 km²) of mostly old growth redwoods for $300 million to protect the marbled murrelet, spotted owl, and other old growth dwellers. As required by regulatory authorities, buffer zones have been further developed around rivers to prevent erosion and maintain animal habitats, but the Eel River, the region's major waterway, has been considerably damaged as a result of more than 150 years of logging activity, not all of which is the result of PALCO operations.
In 1999 PALCO agreed to American activist Julia Butterfly Hill's requests to create a  buffer zone around a 600-year old-growth redwood named Luna in exchange for leaving the tree, as she had been living in it for just over two years. Though someone vandalized the tree during the process, it survives to the present.

In 2003, the Company was sued civilly, by the District Attorney of Humboldt County, for fraud and violations of the California Business and Professions Code. The suit was predicated on the allegation that PALCO had affirmatively represented that its timber operations would have a similar environmental impact across all of its land holdings, when in fact there were wide variances and effects on differing watershed environments. The suit was ultimately dismissed by a California Superior Court Judge, but was later appealed to the California Court of Appeal. In January 2008, the California court of Appeal for the 1st district upheld the trial court's dismissal of the litigation, and the suit is for all practical purposes over. During the pendency of this litigation MAXXAM filed for Bankruptcy. Reports indicate that the family that owns the GAP Stores who are already investors in timber lands in Mendocino county, just south of Humboldt county have submitted a proposal to take over PALCO to the Bankruptcy court in Corpus Christie, TX. Environmentalists hailed the move as being a vast improvement on the increased logging approach by Charles Hurwitz and MAXXAM.

Notes

References
 Harris, David. The Last Stand: The War between Wall Street and Main Street over California's Ancient Redwoods. San Francisco: Sierra Club Books, 1997. .

External links
North Coast Journal—at least 380 articles on the developments within and surrounding PALCO.
San Francisco Chronicle—multiple stories and editorials related to PALCO.
Pacific Lumber's environmental record
Critique of PALCO's environmental program

Companies based in Humboldt County, California
Defunct California railroads
Logging railroads in the United States
Defunct companies based in California
Predecessors of the Northwestern Pacific Railroad
Railway companies established in 1863
Railway companies disestablished in 1903
American companies established in 1863
Defunct forest products companies of the United States
1863 establishments in California
1903 disestablishments in California
American companies disestablished in 2008
2008 disestablishments in California